Ulica Długa (The Long Lane) in Gdańsk, Poland, is one of the most notable tourist attractions of the city. 

It leads from the Golden Gate (Złota Brama, Langgasser Tor) to the Długi Targ (Long Market), and the Green Gate (Brama Zielona).

Buildings
 Dom Ferberów/Ferberhaus
 Dom Schumanów
 Dom Uphagena
 Löwenschloß/Lwi Zamek (Lion Castle)

References
 Jerzy Samp, Bedeker Gdański, Danzig 1994
 Website über Danzig
 Polyglott Apa Guide Polen

External links 

Tourist attractions in Gdańsk
Gdańsk